The following lists events that happened during 2000 in the United States.

Incumbents

Federal government 
 President: Bill Clinton (D-Arkansas)
 Vice President: Al Gore (D-Tennessee)
 Chief Justice: William Rehnquist (Wisconsin) 
 Speaker of the House of Representatives: Dennis Hastert (R-Illinois)
 Senate Majority Leader: Trent Lott (R-Mississippi)
 Congress: 106th

Events

January
 January 4 – Alan Greenspan is nominated for a fourth term as U.S. Federal Reserve Chairman.
 January 5–8 – The 2000 al-Qaeda Summit of several high-level al-Qaeda members (including two 9/11 American Airlines hijackers) is held in Kuala Lumpur, Malaysia.
 January 10 – America Online announces an agreement to purchase Time Warner for $162 billion (the largest-ever corporate merger).
 January 12 – Elián González affair: Attorney General Janet Reno rules that a child rescued by the Coast Guard must be returned to his father in Cuba.
 January 14 – The Dow Jones Industrial Average closes at 11,722.98 (at the peak of the Dot-com bubble).
January 19 – A dorm fire at Seton Hall University kills three people and injures several others. Three years later, Sean Ryan and Joseph LePore are convicted of arson and sentenced to five years in prison.
 January 26 – The rap-metal band Rage Against the Machine plays in front of Wall Street, prompting an early closing of trading due to the crowds.
 January 30 – Super Bowl XXXIV: The St. Louis Rams win the NFL Championship for the first time since 1951, defeating the Tennessee Titans 23–16.
 January 31 – Alaska Airlines Flight 261 crashes in the Pacific Ocean, killing all 88 people on board.

February
 February 11 – A blast from an improvized explosive device in front of a Barclay's Bank, across from the New York Stock Exchange on Wall Street, wounds dozens but kills none.
 February 13 – The final original Peanuts comic strip is published, following the death of its creator, Charles Schulz. 
 February 17 – Microsoft releases Windows 2000.

March
 March 7 – Texas Governor George W. Bush and U.S. Vice President Al Gore emerge victorious in the Republican and Democratic caucuses and primaries of the United States presidential election.
 March 9 – The FBI arrests art forgery suspect Ely Sakhai in New York City.
 March 10 – The NASDAQ Composite Index reaches an all-time high of 5,048.
 March 20 – Jamil Abdullah Al-Amin (H. Rap Brown), a former Black Panther, is captured after a gun battle in Atlanta, Georgia that leaves a sheriff's deputy dead.
 March 21 – The U.S. Supreme Court rules that the government lacks authority to regulate tobacco as an addictive drug, throwing out the Clinton administration's main anti-smoking initiative.
 March 26 – The 72nd Academy Awards, hosted by Billy Crystal, are held at Shrine Auditorium in Los Angeles. Sam Mendes' American Beauty wins five awards out of eight nominations, including Best Picture and Director. The telecast garners over 46.5 million viewers.
 March 27 – The Phillips explosion of 2000 kills one and injures 71 in Pasadena, Texas.

April
 April – The unemployment rate drops to a low of 3.8%, the lowest since December 1969.
 April – The labor force participation rate hits a historical peak of 67.4%.
 April – The employment-population ratio reaches an all-time high of 64.8%.
 April 1
 The 2000 United States Census determines the resident population of the United States to be 281,421,906.
 Boomerang, a secondary digital Cartoon Network channel, debuts.
 April 3 – United States v. Microsoft: Microsoft is ruled to have violated United States antitrust laws by keeping "an oppressive thumb" on its competitors.
 April 22 – In a predawn raid, federal agents seize 6-year old Elián González from his relatives' home in Miami, Florida and fly him to his Cuban father in Washington, DC, ending one of the most publicized custody battles in U.S. history.
 April 25 – The State of Vermont passes HB847, legalizing civil unions for same-sex couples.
 April 28 – Richard Baumhammers begins a two-hour racially motivated shooting spree in Pittsburgh, Pennsylvania, leaving five dead and one paralyzed.

May
 May 3 – In San Antonio, Texas, computer pioneer Datapoint files for Chapter 11 bankruptcy.
 May 16 – The Federal Reserve raises its benchmark interest rate by half a percentage point to 6.5 percent, the first increase of more than a quarter point since February 1995.
 May 19 – Walt Disney Pictures' 39th feature film, Dinosaur, is released.
 May 24 – Five people are shot and killed during a robbery at a Wendy's in Queens, New York.
 May 28 – The comic strip Bringing Up Father ends its 87-year run in newspapers.
 May – Northern Lights Local Exchange Point is founded.

June
 June 1 – Expo 2000, the world's fair in Hanover, Germany, begins without the attendance of the United States.
 June 5 – 405 The Movie, the first short film widely distributed on the Internet, is released.
 June 7 – United States Microsoft antitrust case: A Court orders the breakup of the Microsoft corporation because of its monopoly in the computer software market.
 June 28 – Elián González affair: Elián González returns to Cuba with his father.

July
 July 12 – A 30-year-old American mechanic named Thomas Jones is pursued by law enforcement officers from the Philadelphia Police Department in Philadelphia, Pennsylvania. More than one dozen officers beat and attacked Jones while he was wounded.
 July 14 – X-Men, directed by Bryan Singer, is released as the first film in the X-Men film series.
 July 31 – August 3 – The Republican National Convention in Philadelphia, Pennsylvania nominates Texas Governor George W. Bush for U.S. president and Dick Cheney for vice president.

August
 August 8 – The Confederate submarine H. L. Hunley is raised to the surface after 136 years on the ocean floor.
 August 14 – Dora the Explorer premieres on Nick Jr. with the episode "The Legend of the Big Red Chicken."
 August 14–17 – The Democratic National Convention in Los Angeles nominates U.S. Vice President Al Gore for president and Senator Joe Lieberman for vice president.

September
 September 3 – The 5.0  Yountville earthquake shook the North Bay area of California with a maximum Mercalli intensity of VII (Very strong), causing 41 injuries and $10–50 million in losses.
 September 4 – Caillou and Clifford the Big Red Dog premiere on PBS Kids.
 September 6 – In Paragould, Arkansas, Breanna Lynn Bartlett-Stewart is stillborn to Jason Stewart and Lisa Bartlett. Breanna Lynn's stillbirth is notable for being the first stillbirth to be identified by means of the Kleihauer-Betke test.
 September 8 – The United Nations Millennium Declaration is made in New York City.

October

 October 1 – In the final baseball game played at Three Rivers Stadium, the Pittsburgh Pirates lose to the Chicago Cubs 10–9.
 October 3 – The first debate of the Presidential Election is held at the University of Massachusetts Boston with Jim Lehrer moderating.
 October 5 – Bernard Shaw hosts the vice presidential debate between Joe Lieberman and Dick Cheney.
 October 11
  of coal sludge spill in Martin County, Kentucky (considered a greater environmental disaster than the Exxon Valdez oil spill).
 Jim Lehrer hosts the second presidential debate at Wake Forest University.
 October 12 – In Aden, Yemen, the USS Cole is badly damaged by two Al-Qaeda suicide bombers, who place a small boat laden with explosives alongside the United States Navy destroyer, killing 17 crew members and wounding at least 39.
 October 16 – Mel Carnahan, Democratic Governor of Missouri and U.S. Senate candidate, dies in a plane crash in Jefferson County, Missouri, three weeks before the election for that office. Lieutenant Governor Roger B. Wilson succeeds Carnahan as Missouri's Governor.
 October 17 – The final debate of the presidential election takes place at Washington University in St. Louis.
 October 23 – Madeleine Albright holds talks with North Korean dictator Kim Jong Il.
 October 26 – The New York Yankees defeat the New York Mets in Game 5 of the 2000 World Series, 4–1, to win their 26th World Series title. This is the first Subway Series matchup between the two crosstown rivals. It is the Yankees' fourth World Series win under manager Joe Torre.

November
 November 6 – Toxicologist Kristin Rossum murders her husband Gregory de Villers in San Diego by poisoning him with fentanyl. She successfully passes off the crime as a suicide for several months before being charged.
 November 7 
2000 United States presidential election: Republican candidate Texas Governor George W. Bush defeats Democratic Vice President Al Gore in the closest election in history, but the outcome is not known for over a month because of disputed votes in Florida.
Hillary Clinton is elected to the United States Senate, becoming the first First Lady of the United States to win public office.
Just three weeks after his death, Mel Carnahan is posthumously elected to the United States Senate defeating Republican incumbent John Ashcroft. Then-Governor Roger B. Wilson appoints his widow, Jean Carnahan, to fill the seat for him.  
 November 8 – U.S. presidential election, 2000: Per Florida law, an automatic recount begins in the state due to the narrow margin of the outcome.
 November 12 – The United States recognizes the Federal Republic of Yugoslavia.
 November 16 – Bill Clinton becomes the first sitting U.S. president to visit Vietnam.
 November 17 – U.S. presidential election, 2000: The Supreme Court of Florida prevents Florida Secretary of State Katherine Harris from certifying the election results, allowing recounting to continue.

December

 December 8 – U.S. presidential election, 2000: The Supreme Court of Florida orders a statewide manual recount of the votes in the presidential election. The next day the U.S. Supreme Court places a stay on this order.
 December 12 – U.S. presidential election, 2000 – Bush v. Gore: The U.S. Supreme Court overturns the ruling by the Florida Supreme Court, ending the recount and effectively giving the state, and the Presidency, to Texas Governor George W. Bush. The following day, U.S. Vice President Al Gore concedes the election and suspends the activities of his recount committee.
 December 13 – The Texas Seven escape from their prison unit in Kenedy, Texas, and start a crime spree.
 December 15 – Walt Disney Pictures' 40th feature film, The Emperor's New Groove, is released after years of production issues. Though the box office haul is disappointing compared to Disney's Renaissance-era releases, it is later praised as one of their best films of the post-Renaissance era.
 December 16 
Property appraiser Jerry Michael Williams is reported missing after going duck hunting at Lake Seminole and is assumed to have accidentally drowned. His wife Denise is convicted of his murder 18 years later.
The Pittsburgh Steelers close out the final game at Three Rivers Stadium with a 24–6 victory over the Washington Redskins.
 December 20 – Brothers Reginald and Jonathan Carr break into a house in Wichita, Kansas, subjecting the occupants to rape and torture, and eventual murder. Only one of the occupants survived and the brothers were caught the next day. The event became known as the Wichita massacre. 
 December 24 – The Texas Seven rob a sports store in Irving, Texas; police officer Aubrey Hawkins is shot dead.
 December 26 – Wakefield Massacre: Michael McDermott kills seven coworkers at Edgewater Technology in Wakefield, Massachusetts.
 December 28 – U.S. retail giant Montgomery Ward announces it is going out of business after 128 years.
 December 31 – President Bill Clinton signs the Rome Statute of the International Criminal Court.

Ongoing
 Iraqi no-fly zones (1991–2003)
 Dot-com bubble (c. 1995–c. 2000)
 Y2K Scare (1998-2000)

Date unknown
 Gauthier Biomedical business is founded in Grafton, Wisconsin.
 The Music Gym concept and name is first coined in Boston by Ryan McVinney.

Births

January 

 January 1 – Ice Spice, rapper
 January 4 – Rhiannon Leigh Wryn, actress
 January 7 – Marcus Scribner, actor
 January 8 – Noah Cyrus, actress
 January 9
Flo Milli, rapper
Toosii, rapper
 January 10 – Reneé Rapp, actress and singer
 January 11 – Shareef O'Neal, basketball player
 January 26 – Piper Mackenzie Harris, actress and model
 January 28 – Julia Lester, singer and actress

February 

 February 1 – Paris Smith, American actress and singer
 February 5 – Jordan Nagai, actor
 February 14 – Catie Turner, singer
 February 10 – Yara Shahidi, actress
 February 21 – Lauren Godwin, TikToker
 February 25
Tucker Albrizzi, actor
Daniel Benoit, son of Nancy Benoit and murdered by his father Chris Benoit (d. 2007)

March 

 March 5 – Gabby Barrett, singer-songwriter 
 March 6 – Jacob Bertrand, actor
 March 10 – Norah Flatley, artistic gymnast
 March 21 – Jace Norman, actor
 March 25 
 Camden Pulkinen, figure skater
 Sha'Carri Richardson, sprinter 
 Christian Traeumer, actor
 March 27 – Halle Bailey, musician
 March 28 – Matthew DeLisi, gamer
 March 30 
 Colton Herta, race car driver
 Regan Mizrahi, actor

April 

 April 6 – CJ Adams, actor
 April 7 – Big Scarr, rapper (died 2022)
 April 9 – Jackie Evancho, singer
 April 10 – Surf Mesa, electronic musician
 April 11 
 Alexei Krasnozhon, Russian-American figure skater
 Morgan Lily, actress
 April 12 – David Hogg, gun-control activist 
 April 23 – Chloe Kim, snowboarder

May 
 May 1 – 9lokkNine, rapper
 May 7 – Maxwell Perry Cotton, actor
 May 18 – Carlie Hanson, musician
 May 23 – Jaxson Hayes, basketball player
 May 30 – Jared S. Gilmore, actor
 May 31 – Gable Steveson, wrestler

June 

 June 1 – Willow Shields, actress
 June 2 – Andy Lopez, student (d. 2013)
June 8
Hayes Grier, Internet personality
Charlotte Lawrence, singer-songwriter
 June 9 – Laurie Hernandez, artistic gymnast
 June 13
Hotboii, rapper
Daniella Perkins, actress and internet personality
 June 16 – Tay-K, rapper and convicted murderer
 June 17 – Odessa A'zion, actress
 June 22 – Maliq Johnson, actor

July 

 July 7 – Chloe Csengery, actress
 July 8
 Sophie Nyweide, actress
 Benjamin Stockham, actor
 July 14 – Maia Reficco, actress and singer
 July 16 – Jonathan Morgan Heit, actor
 July 24 – Ame Deal, murder victim (d. 2011)
 July 25  
 Preston Bailey, actor
 Mason Cook, actor
 Meg Donnelly, actress
 July 28
Emily Hahn, actress
Audrey Mika, singer

August 

 August 1 – Lil Loaded, rapper (d. 2021)
 August 3
Landry Bender, actress
Ron Suno, rapper and youtuber
 August 12 – Prince Achileas-Andreas of Greece and Denmark, son of Pavlos, Crown Prince of Greece
 August 13 – Piper Reese, journalist
 August 15 – Umi Garrett, classical pianist
 August 17 – Lil Pump, rapper
 August 20 – Fátima Ptacek, actress and model 
 August 24 – Griffin Gluck, actor
 August 25 – Nick Mira, record producer
 August 29 – Adam Nash, notable child

September 

 September 3 – Ashley Boettcher, actress
 September 12 – Laine Hardy, singer
 September 22 – Tallan Latz, guitar player
 September 28 – Frankie Jonas, actor

October 

 October 2 – Quadeca, rapper and youtuber
 October 6 
 Jazz Jennings, YouTube personality
 Addison Rae, social media personality and dancer 
 October 9 – Harrison Burton, stock car racer 
 October 10 – Aedin Mincks, actor
 October 11
 Hayden Byerly, actor
 Adin Ross, youtuber
 October 12 – Aedin Mincks, actor
 October 13 – Lydia Night, musician
 October 22 – Baby Keem, rapper
 October 25 – Vincent Zhou, figure skater 
 October 26 – Ellery Sprayberry, actress
 October 31 – Willow Smith, actress, singer, and the daughter of Will and Jada Pinkett Smith

November 

 November 7 – Dara Reneé, actress
 November 8 – Jade Pettyjohn, actress
 November 10 – Mackenzie Foy, model and actress
 November 13 – 24kGoldn, rapper
 November 22 
 Auliʻi Cravalho, actress
 Baby Ariel, singer-songwriter, actress, and social media personality.

December 

 December 9 – Jaren Lewison, actor
 December 12
 JiDion, youtuber
 Lucas Jade Zumann, actor
 December 16 – Lance Lim, actor
 December 22 – Joshua Bassett, actor and singer
 December 24 – Ethan Bortnick, singer, composer, songwriter, actor, and musician
 December 26 – Samuel Sevian, American-Armenian chess grandmaster

Full date unknown
 Brigid Harrington, actress, singer, dancer and voice artist
 Tristan Lake Leabu, actor
 Marla Olmstead, artist

Deaths

January 
 January 6 – Don Martin, cartoonist (b. 1931)
 January 11 – Bob Lemon, baseball player and manager (b. 1920)
 January 15 – Fran Ryan, actress (b. 1916)
 January 18
 Jester Hairston, actor and composer (b. 1901)
 Frances Drake, actress (b. 1912)
 January 19 – Alan North, actor (b. 1920) 
 January 25 – Herta Freitag, Austrian-born American mathematician (b. 1908)
 January 26
 Don Budge, tennis player (b. 1915)
 Don Ralke, music arranger (b. 1920)

February 
 February 4 – Phil Tonken, radio and television announcer (b. 1919)
 February 7 – Big Pun, rapper (b. 1971)
 February 8 – Derrick Thomas, American football player (b. 1967)
 February 9
 Beau Jack, boxer (b. 1921)
 Steve Furness, football player (b. 1950)
 February 10
 George Jackson, movie producer (b. 1958)
 Jim Varney, actor noted for his character, Ernest P. Worrell (b. 1949)
 February 12
 Newt Arnold, film director (b. 1922)
 Jalacy "Screamin' Jay" Hawkins, musician, died in Neuilly-sur-Seine, France (b. 1929)
 Tom Landry, American football coach (b. 1924)
 Charles M. Schulz, comic strip artist (b. 1922)
 February 29 – Dennis Danell, musician (b. 1961)

March 
 March 10 – Barbara Cooney, author and illustrator (b. 1917)
 March 14 – Tommy Collins, country musician (b. 1930).
 March 24 – Al Grey, American jazz trombonist (b. 1925).

April 
 April 5 – Lee Petty, race car driver (b. 1914)
 April 10 – Larry Linville, actor (b. 1939)
 April 11 – Opaline Deveraux Wadkins, African American nurse educator (b. 1912)
 April 14 – Phil Katz, computer programmer (b. 1962)
 April 15 – Edward Gorey, writer and illustrator (b. 1925)
 April 25 – David Merrick, stage producer, died in London, United Kingdom (b. 1911)
 April 27 – Vicki Sue Robinson, singer and actress (b. 1954)
 April 30 – Maggie Calloway, actress (b. 1910)

May 
 May 8 – Henry Nicols, HIV/AIDS activist (b. 1973)
 May 10 – Craig Stevens, actor (b. 1918)
 May 12 – Adam Petty, race car driver (b. 1980)
 May 20 – Edward Bernds, director (b. 1905)
 May 21 – Mark R. Hughes, businessman (b. 1956)
 May 31 – John Coolidge, businessman and son of President Calvin Coolidge (b. 1906)

June 
 June 8 – Jeff MacNelly, American cartoonist (b. 1947)
 June 14 – Robert Trent Jones, British-born golf course designer, died in Fort Lauderdale, Florida (b. 1906)
 June 15 – James Montgomery Boice, American pastor and theologian (b. 1938)
 June 18 – Nancy Marchand, actress (b. 1928)
 June 21 – Alan Hovhaness, composer (b. 1911)

July 
 July 1 – Walter Matthau, actor (b. 1920)
 July 7 – James C. Quayle, newspaper publisher (b. 1921)
 July 14 – Meredith MacRae, actress (b. 1944)
 July 27 – Gordon Solie, wrestling commentator (b. 1929)

August 
 August 9
 Bob Lido, musician (b. 1914)
 Lewis Wilson, actor (b. 1920)
 August 12
 Dave Edwards, musician (b. 1941)
 Loretta Young, actress (b. 1913)
 August 25 – Carl Barks, cartoonist (b. 1901)

September 
 September 2
 Elvera Sanchez, dancer (b. 1905)
 Jean Speegle Howard, actress (b. 1927) 
 September 3
 R. H. Harris, American gospel singer (b. 1916)
 Walt Stanchfield, American animator (b. 1919)
 September 4 – David Brown, American bass guitarist (Santana) (b. 1950)
 September 5 – George Musso, American football player (Chicago Bears) and member of the Pro Football Hall of Fame (b. 1910).
 September 17 – Nicole Reinhart, cyclist (b. 1976)
 September 26 – Carl Sigman, songwriter (b. 1909)

October 
 October 4 – George Huntston Williams, theologian (b. 1914)
 October 16 – 
 Mel Carnahan, politician from Missouri (b. 1934)
 Rick Jason, actor (b. 1923)
 October 22 – Rodney Anoa'i, wrestler, died in Liverpool, United Kingdom (b. 1966)
 October 30 – Steve Allen, comedian, composer, talk show host, and author (b. 1921)

November 
 November 6 – L. Sprague de Camp, writer (b. 1907)
 November 14 – Robert Trout, American journalist (b. 1908)
 November 25 – Hugh Alexander, American baseball player and scout (b. 1917)
 November 28
 Robert Bentley, American animator (b. 1907)
 Henry B. Gonzalez, American politician (b. 1916)

December 
 December 2 – Gail Fisher, actress (b. 1935)
 December 3 – Gwendolyn Brooks, African American poet (b. 1917)
 December 10 – Marie Windsor, actress (b. 1919)
 December 12 – George Montgomery, actor (b. 1916)
 December 19 – John Lindsay, politician, lawyer and broadcaster (b. 1921)
 December 23 
 Billy Barty, actor (b. 1924)
 Victor Borge, comedian, conductor and pianist (b. 1909 in Denmark)
 December 24
 Nick Massi, bass singer and bass guitarist for The Four Seasons (b. 1935)
 Laurence Chisholm Young, mathematician (b. 1905).
 December 25
 Robert Francis Garner, Roman Catholic prelate (b. 1920).
 Willard Van Orman Quine, philosopher (b. 1908)
 December 26 – Jason Robards, actor (b. 1922).
 December 28 – Robert Williams, baseball player (b. 1917).
 December 29 – Adele Stimmel Chase, artist (b. 1917)
 December 30 – Julius J. Epstein, screenwriter (b. 1909)

See also 
 2000 in American soccer
 2000 in American television
 List of American films of 2000

References

External links
 

 
2000s in the United States
United States
United States
Years of the 20th century in the United States